Rohan Brown (born 2 October 1957) is an educator and former Australian rules footballer. He played with Carlton in the Victorian Football League (VFL).

Notes

External links 

Rohan Brown's profile at Blueseum

1957 births
Carlton Football Club players
Old Melburnians Football Club players
Living people
Australian rules footballers from Victoria (Australia)